Francesco Fedeli, nicknamed Francesco Maggiotto or  also il Maggiotto (1738 – 13 September 1805) was an Italian painter from Venice.

Life 
Francesco Maggiotto was the son of Domenico Fedeli, with whom he shared the nickname "Maggiotto"; in the early years he was trained in the same style as his father's. At first, he was also influenced, among others, by Piazzetta, Pittoni, Tiepolo and Zuccarelli, drawing inspiration from contemporary painting styles. The painting La Pittura e la Natura (1769) was painted in this early period, and Maggiotto offered it to the Accademia di Belle Arti di Venezia; today it is still stored in the Gallerie dell'Accademia . He also imitated Pietro Longhi's style but with less irony and greater moralism.

In the following years, his painting style became more detached and the commission of works about Mythology and Religion increased. Among other things, in 1778 he painted a series of 168 smallRitratti di dogi, dogaresse, veneti patriarchi, cardinali e pontefici in oil on copper for the bibliophile Maffeo Pinelli; those paintings went lost, even though some of them could be found in the antiques market.

Later he adopted painting styles that somehow anticipated neoclassicism: this is the case of the Trionfo della Croce and the monochrome angels painted for the Scuola grande di San Giovanni Evangelista and paintings for Chiesa di San Francesco della Vigna.

Starting from the 1790s, he had a strong stylistic involution: this is the case of the Autoritratto con gli allievi Pedrini e Florian (1792). Of considerable importance is the fact that in 1771 he was appointed master of painting in the Venetian Academy, of which he also became president (1790). There he had, among his pupils, some painters that would become prominent  of Venetian neoclassicism, such as Lattanzio Querena, Giovanni Carlo Bevilacqua, Natale Schiavoni and even Francesco Hayez. In 1796, he was appointed "inspector of public paintings in Venice" with the aim of reporting on the state of publicly owned paintings, a public office that he held even at the beginning of the French occupation Maggiotto died in Venice on 13 September 1805.

Scientific interests 
Maggiotto also carried out some experiments and built some machines in the field of physics, and in particular electricity; he also wrote a few works about his experiences. Furthermore, according to what can be inferred from Maggiotto's testament and the autobiography of one of his pupils, Giovanni Carlo Bevilacqua, Maggiotto invented and built some telescopes and camerae obscurae. Thanks to his research, he was also appointed member of the Royal Society of London.

The electric machine 
In a letter to abbot Giuseppe Toaldo, Francesco Maggiotto explained his progress in the field of electricity and, in particular, in the development of a machine capable of generating electric discharges by rubbing (triboelectric effect). In the 18th century, the desire of scholars to carry out experiments and verify theories grew not only for research purposes, but also among students and, especially in Great Britain, some workshops specialized in the construction of scientific equipment flourished. If needed or for lack of funds, as in the case of Italian scientist Luca de Samuele Cagnazzi, the scholars had to build by themselves the scientific devices they needed.

Maggiotto, in the letter, explains how he carried out countless tests and, together with his brother, he built many models of electric machines capable of releasing the "electrical fluid". His efforts, as well as those of other contemporary scholars, were to maximize the electric discharge in order to make the machine useful to physicists. Many tests had already been carried out, and various types of machines had been built which used cylinders or discs which, when rubbed with an external object, became charged with electrostatic energy and released very powerful sparks; this showed the physicists of the time that there was fluido elettrico ("electrical fluid"), as it was then called.

Some models of electric machines coupled several cylinders or discs but this, according to Maggiotto, did not proportionally increase the electrostatic energy accumulated and therefore the intensity of the spark. Maggiotto noticed the excellent properties of crystal in generating electrostatic energy by rubbing, but a disk or cylinder made of crystal could not be built since there is no crystal of this size in nature and, even if there was, it would be too expensive.

Maggiotto's idea, which improved the efficiency of the machine according to his own experiments, was to use a single disc or cylinder (rather than many), using multiple materials and in particular boxwood for the real cylinder (the "wheel") with a diameter of 30 oncie, on whose circumference the crystals were fixed with screws. These crystals, during the movement of the wheel, rubbed against four strofinatori, that is, bearings of eight inches each, made up of crini (probably animal hair) covered with a very thin sheet of brass (at the time commonly called oro cantarino). Furthermore, these bearings were pressed against the surface of the wheel by means of springs. According to Maggiotto's experiments, this model of bearings was very efficient thanks to the particular insulating properties of the crini and his idea was copied by other developers of electric machines. The avbove bearings were connected to conducting materials (such as wires), in turn connected to some pots containing "tin sheets", whose purpose was to store the electrostatic energy produced by the machine.

According to his experiments, the efficiency of the machine (and therefore the intensity of the electric discharge) was much greater than other machines and it achieved excellent results even with unfavorable environmental conditions such as the presence of high humidity in the atmosphere; this was due to the high electric resistivity of the crini, used both in the bearings and for the insulation of conductors. According to Maggiotto, a similar machine could be built with a larger diameter as well as with a greater number of bearings and crystals, thus making the machine capable of generating more powerful electric discharges. This would make harder to operate the machine because of the greater necessary force; one way to overcome this drawback, according to Maggiotto, could be the use of hydropower. Another advantage given by the machine is the ease of use and the fact that it could be easily repaired in case of breakdowns.

The electric discharge generated and contained in the above pots was able to pierce "20 large sheets of carton paper, placed one above the other, which had the thickness of an inch and a half". Maggiotto understood that there is "no such a body in nature that does not entirely let the electrical fluid escape", i.e. all materials exhibit a certain degree of electric resistance and spread some electricity through the air and other means.

Works

Bibliography

References

1738 births
1805 deaths
18th-century Italian painters
Italian male painters
19th-century Italian painters
Painters from Venice
Academic staff of the Accademia di Belle Arti di Venezia
19th-century Italian male artists
18th-century Italian male artists